Battle of Turin may refer to:

 Battle of Turin (312), between Constantine the Great and Maxentius
 Siege of Turin (1640), in the Franco-Spanish War and Piedmontese Civil War
 Siege of Turin (1706), during the War of the Spanish Succession